The WuFeng University (WFU) is a private university of technology in Minxiong Township, Chiayi County, Taiwan with more than 6000 students.

WuFeng University offers undergraduate and graduate programs in a wide range of fields, including business, engineering, design, humanities, and social sciences. The university has six colleges: the College of Engineering, the College of Management, the College of Design, the College of Humanities, the College of Social Sciences, and the College of Law.

History
The approval for the establishment of the university was issued in September 1963 for a business vocational school named Wufeng Business College. In October 1965, the school was approved for students admission named Private Wufeng Commercial College. In August 1969, it was renamed to Wufeng Industrial College and in August 2000 to Wufeng Technical College. In August 2010, it was finally renamed to Wu Feng University of Science and Technology and in October 2012 to Wufeng University Consortium Wufeng University of Science and Technology.

Faculties
 College of Digital Entrepreneurship
 College of Safety and Engineering
 College of Tourism and Hospitality

Transportation
The university is accessible within walking distance south of Minxiong Station of Taiwan Railways.

See also
 List of universities in Taiwan

References

1965 establishments in Taiwan
Educational institutions established in 1965
Universities and colleges in Chiayi County
Universities and colleges in Taiwan
Technical universities and colleges in Taiwan